The rufous chatterer (Argya rubiginosa) is a species of bird in the family Leiothrichidae.
It is found in Ethiopia, Kenya, Somalia, Sudan, Tanzania, and Uganda.
Its natural habitats are dry savanna and subtropical or tropical dry shrubland.

This species was formerly placed in the genus Turdoides but following the publication of a comprehensive molecular phylogenetic study in 2018, it was moved to the resurrected genus Argya.

References

Collar, N. J. & Robson, C. 2007. Family Timaliidae (Babblers)  pp. 70 – 291 in; del Hoyo, J., Elliott, A. & Christie, D.A. eds. Handbook of the Birds of the World, Vol. 12. Picathartes to Tits and Chickadees. Lynx Edicions, Barcelona.

rufous chatterer
Birds of East Africa
rufous chatterer
Taxonomy articles created by Polbot